Yav may refer to:

 Mayne Island Water Aerodrome, by IATA code
 Jav, Prav and Nav, the worlds described in the Book of Veles
 Yangben language, by ISO 639 code
 Yav (album), a 2014 album by the Russian pagan metal band Arkona